Jesse D. Anthony (born June 12, 1985 in Beverly, Massachusetts) is an American former professional road cyclist and cyclo-cross racer, who rode professionally between 2006 and 2018 for the Kodakgallery.com–Sierra Nevada,  and  teams. Anthony now works for USA Cycling as their cyclo-cross manager.

Major results

2007
 4th Overall Rás Tailteann
2010
 1st Overall Festningsrittet
 2nd Overall Tour de Korea
2011
 1st Overall Nature Valley Grand Prix
 1st Stage 1 Tour of Utah
 9th Overall Jelajah Malaysia
2012
 1st Stage 5 Cascade Cycling Classic
 2nd Tour of the Battenkill
2013
 2nd Philadelphia International Championship
2014
 1st Tour de Delta
 3rd Bucks County Classic
 9th Winston-Salem Cycling Classic
2015
 3rd Clássica Loulé
 4th Winston-Salem Cycling Classic
2016
 Tour de Guadeloupe
1st  Points classification
1st Stages 3 & 9
2017
 5th Overall Tour de Normandie

References

External links

1985 births
Living people
American male cyclists